Brinjeva Draga   is a village in Croatia (Primorje-Gorski Kotar County). It is connected by the D32 highway.

Populated places in Primorje-Gorski Kotar County